Jeptha Bradley (December 31, 1802 – June 8, 1864) was a mid-1800s Vermont political figure who served in several elected and appointed offices, including Vermont Auditor of Accounts.

Early life
Bradley was born in Fairfield, Vermont on December 31, 1802. He studied law and was admitted to the bar, afterwards establishing a practice in Franklin and Grand Isle Counties. A Whig, from 1835 to 1839 Bradley served as Sheriff of Franklin County.

Start of political career
Bradley later moved to St. Albans and served in local and county offices including Justice of the Peace and High Bailiff.

He was appointed Inspector of Customs for the station in Alburgh in 1845. In 1847, Bradley was named Postmaster in Highgate Springs.

Additional activities
Bradley was active in the Episcopal church, and served as a Delegate to the 1822 and 1850 annual state conventions.

In 1844 Bradley received a patent for an improved air-heating furnace.

Bradley was one of the founders of the Horticultural Society for the Valley of Lake Champlain in 1850.

Later political career
In 1849 Bradley was elected county Probate Judge, serving until 1850.

Bradley served as Register of Probate from 1850 to 1852, and again in 1854.

He became a Republican when the party was founded in the 1850s.  In 1860 he was elected State Auditor by the Vermont General Assembly, and served until his death.

Death and burial
Bradley died in St. Albans on June 8, 1864.  He was buried at Greenwood Cemetery in St. Albans.

References

1802 births
1864 deaths
Vermont Whigs
19th-century American politicians
Vermont Republicans
Vermont sheriffs
Vermont state court judges
State Auditors of Vermont
Vermont lawyers
People from Franklin County, Vermont
Burials in Vermont
United States Customs Service personnel
19th-century American judges
19th-century American lawyers